The Netherlands and Belgium are doing a joint procurement for the replacements of the Tripartite-class/Alkmaar-class minehunters. Both countries want to procure six new mine countermeasure (MCM) vessels, which makes for a total of 12 MCM ships. The new MCM ships will include a range of unmanned systems including unmanned surface, aerial and underwater vehicles alongside towed sonars and mine identification and neutralization ROVs.

Design and development
In the spring of 2018, the Belgian and Dutch Navy signed a Memorandum of Understanding for the joint construction and financing of the ships. A list of requirements was drawn up for the new vessels. Contenders in the race were:
 The Franco-Belgium consortium made up of French shipbuilders STX France and Socarenam together with Belgium's EDR are bidding for the 12 new MCM vessels. Their plan includes the construction of MCM vessels named Sea Naval Solutions and a multi-role frigate named Deviceseas, which will serve as mothership to the MCM vessels. All ships will have a strong focus on autonomous systems operations.
 France's Naval Group and  established Belgian subsidiary Naval & Robotics and bid for the program.
 Imtech Belgium and Damen Group bid for the program.
The contract was won by Naval Group on 15 March 2019. 

The new vessels take a new approach to their task. Instead of fighting mines from a ship, the ships does this with unmanned systems.

Construction
A first steel cutting ceremony for the first-in-class ship for the Belgian Navy was held on 19 July 2021, with the keel being laid on 30 November, 2021. Delivery of the first ship to the Belgian Navy is anticipated in 2024 and to the Royal Netherlands Navy in 2025.
The first ship for the Dutch Navy started on the 4 March, 2022, with a steel cutting ceremony. The keel was laid on 14 June, 2022.

Ships in class

Belgium
Belgium gave the green-light to start the procurement on 26 January 2018 and approved a budget of 1.1 billion euros for the six Belgian MCM ships. Besides the Tripartite-class minehunters, the ships will also replace the Belgian logistical support ship .

Netherlands

Potential operators
 France - At Euronaval 2022 a partnership was signed between the Belgian, Dutch and French navies to enhance cooperation between them. As a result the French Navy will order six variant ships based on the City-class, via their SLAM-F program in 2023.

See also
 Minehunter classes in service
 Future of the Royal Netherlands Navy

References

Mine warfare vessel classes